Owoidighe Ekpoatai  (born 1966) is a Nigerian politician, lawmaker and a member of the Federal House of Representative. She represented Eket/Onna/Esit Eket/Ibeno federal constituency of Akwa-Ibom State. She was elected into the National Assembly under the platform of the Peoples Democratic Party (PDP).

Education 
Owoidighe had her secondary school education at Girls Secondary School (GSS) AFANA before proceeding to the University of Uyo, Uyo where she completed a bachelor's degree in Accounting. In 2003, She completed a master's degree in Business Administration (MBA) from Imo State University, Owerri.

Political career
She started her political career in 2012 as a State Treasurer for the People's Democratic party in Akwa-Ibom State. In March 2015, she was elected into the Federal House of Representative to represent Eket, Onna, Esit Eket and Ibeno Federal Constituency.

Award
Owoidighe was given the Justice of Peace award in 2006 and also an Ambassador of Peace award in 2009.

See also 
List of members of the House of Representatives of Nigeria, 2015–2019

References

Nigerian politicians
1966 births
Living people
Politics of Akwa Ibom State